The 2013 season was Sarawak FA's 1st season in the Malaysia Premier League, after relegated in 2012 Malaysia Super League. Sarawak FA was relegated by Pahang in Playoff Qualifying after the MSL reducing the teams competing in 2013 to 12 teams from 14 teams. 2013 was the best ever Sarawak comeback after almost 13 years of Sarawak Black era. For the 2013 season Sarawak was promoted to 2014 Malaysia Super League after being 1st in the league and being invincible after securing 18 wins with 4 draws and being undefeated throughout the season.

This is Robert Alberts' third season in charge after taking over from Haji Mohd Zaki Sheikh Ahmad in 2011.

Sarawak was successful in home soil with the records of 84% home wins throughout the 2013 season with 91% home league wins. Sarawak only lost to Kelantan in Malaysia FA Cup Quarter-finals by 0–2. Sarawak also drew with Sabah 0–0 in league games and 1–1 to Pahang in the most memorable night of Semi-finals Malaysia Cup which they lost by aggregate 4-2 that stops them to equal their record in 1999 Final Malaysia Cup.

2013 Malaysia Premier League
Sarawak were unbeaten in their league games thus winning it for the first time. They were promoted to Malaysia Super League after defeated Kuala Lumpur 4–0 in Stadium Negeri.

Fixtures and results

2013 Malaysia FA Cup

Round of 32

Round of 16

Quarter-finals

|}

First leg

Second leg

2013 Malaysia Cup

Sarawak were drawn in Group D with Malaysia Super League Champions, Singapore Lions XII, Perak FA and Malaysia Premier League team, Kedah FA whom were the first team to win Double Treble in 2006-2007 and 2007–2008. Sarawak started with a loss to Perak FA in Ipoh Stadium 2-1 after leading 1–0 in the first half. Sarawak buck up in their second match against Lions XII in Stadium Negeri 2–1. Sarawak were drawn 0–0 in Darul Aman after both Kedah and Sarawak fails to score any goals in their third group matches. Sarawak then captivated to win 4–0 in Stadium Negeri defeating Kedah in their fourth matches. With a just a draw will do, Sarawak fails to secure their spot to Quarter-finals in the fifth match after lost 1–0 to the home side Lions XII. Sarawak need to win their last match in order to book their place in the Quarter-finals for the first time since 2006. Sarawak beaten Perak 6–1 with Muamer Salibasic scores hat-trick on that night. Sarawak were group champion of group D while Lions XII placed second.

Sarawak reached their first Malaysia Cup semi-finals in 13 years after defeating Sime Darby 3–1 at the State Stadium in the quarter-final second leg. Sarawak advanced to the semi-finals with a 3-1 aggregate win. However, they were stop by Pahang in Semi-finals after losing 4–2 on aggregate.

Include Semi-final

Group D

Knockout stage

Quarter-finals

First Leg

Second leg

Sarawak FA won 3–1 on aggregate.

Semi-finals

First Leg

Second Leg

Pahang FA won 4–2 on aggregate.

References

Sarawak FA seasons
Sarawak